Jalan Sengkuang (Johor state route J125) is a major road in Johor, Malaysia

List of junctions

Roads in Johor